John Wesley Shipp (born January 22, 1955) is an American actor known for his various television roles. He played the lead Barry Allen on CBS's superhero series The Flash from 1990 to 1991, and Mitch Leery, the title character's father, on the drama series Dawson's Creek from 1998 to 2001. Shipp has also played several roles in daytime soap operas including Kelly Nelson on Guiding Light from 1980 to 1984, and Douglas Cummings on As the World Turns from 1985 to 1986 (which earned him his first Daytime Emmy Award). He portrays Barry Allen's father Henry, Earth-2 Flash Jay Garrick, and Earth-90's Barry Allen/The Flash on the current series entitled The Flash on the CW network.

Early life
Shipp was born in Norfolk, Virginia. His father was a farmer who returned to school when Shipp was young, and after attending the seminary in Wake Forest, North Carolina, he became the pastor of a small church outside Wake Forest. Shipp later gave a keynote speech to the graduating class of Wake Forest Rolesville High School Class of 1999 to recount the tale of his father's attempts to integrate the community in the late 1960s.

Shipp attended Butler High School in Louisville, Kentucky and then attended Indiana University.

Career
Shipp began his career with a regular role on the daytime soap opera Guiding Light, playing Dr. Kelly Nelson from 1980 to 1984. Shipp followed this with more roles in daytime, playing Douglas Cummings on As the World Turns from 1985 to 1986 (which earned him his first Daytime Emmy Award in 1986), and Martin Ellis on Santa Barbara in 1987 (for which he won his second Daytime Emmy Award), followed by Blanchard Lovelace on One Life to Live in 1989, and Carter Jones on All My Children in 1992. He also had guest appearances on primetime series, such as playing a peeper on an episode of Fantasy Island in 1983.

Shipp won the title role of Barry Allen/The Flash on the CBS series The Flash, which aired in the 1990–91 season. He followed this with the recurring role of Lucky on the NBC series Sisters from 1994 to 1995. Shipp also appeared on stage in the 1990s, starring in Erik Jendresen's The Killing of Michael Malloy in 1993. In 1998, he was cast as Mitch Leery, the father of the lead character Dawson, on The WB drama series Dawson's Creek; Shipp remained part of the series' main cast through its first four seasons, exiting in 2001.

In November 2010, Shipp returned to daytime in the short-term role of villainous Eddie Ford on One Life to Live, who was killed off in a murder mystery in mid-December. In the summer of 2011, he guest-starred on the Lifetime series Drop Dead Diva, playing the ex-husband of the character played by comedian Kathy Griffin. Shipp filmed three episodes of the MTV series Teen Wolf as the abusive father of Daniel Sharman's character, which aired during the summer of 2012. Also in 2012, he starred in the independent film Hell and Mr. Fudge, with Mackenzie Astin and Eileen Davidson.

Shipp returned to involvement with The Flash in the 2010s. He was cast in a "mysterious" role on The CW series The Flash in early 2014, which was later revealed to be the recurring role of Henry Allen, the father of titular character. In the second-season finale of The Flash, Shipp played Jay Garrick, an alternate universe counterpart of The Flash. He also provided the voice to the villain Professor Eobard Thawne, the Reverse-Flash, in a 2010 episode of the animated series Batman: The Brave and the Bold.

In 2015, Shipp also began lending his voice to the unique role of Sheriff Burns on the podcast drama "Powder Burns". It ran from 2015 to 2018, and was written and produced by David A. Gregory, and was recognized by the Voice Arts Awards and the Audio Verse Awards.

Shipp returned to the stage in 2016 as Juror #8 in Judson Theatre Company's production of Twelve Angry Men. He also performed the same role in a 2017 reading of the play at Brookfield Theatre for the Arts.

Filmography

Film

Television

Awards and nominations
At the 14th Annual Daytime Emmy Awards in 1987, Shipp won the Outstanding Guest Performer Award (in a category that included Celeste Holm, Eileen Heckart, and Terrance Mann) becoming the only actor with consecutive wins from two different daytime dramas.

References

External links

 

1955 births
Living people
American male film actors
American male soap opera actors
American male television actors
Actors from Norfolk, Virginia
Male actors from Virginia
Daytime Emmy Award winners
Daytime Emmy Award for Outstanding Supporting Actor in a Drama Series winners
Daytime Emmy Award for Outstanding Guest Performer in a Drama Series winners
Butler High School alumni
Indiana University Bloomington alumni